Nicola Malinconico (16631721) was a Neapolitan painter of the late-Baroque. He is described as a follower of Luca Giordano, and painted mostly religious canvases. He painted the chapel altarpieces for the church of St Michele Arcangelo in Anacapri. He also painted still life paintings recalling work by Pietro Paolo Bonzi and Paolo Porpora and influenced by the Flemish still life painter David de Coninck.

Around 1700, he was commissioned by bishop Oronzo Filomarino to decorate the cathedral of Gallipoli in the province of Lecce. He completed large canvases of Christ clearing the moneylenders from the temple in the counter-facade; Entry into Jerusalem, Miracle of the lame, Burial of Saint Agatha. On the ceiling he painted Saint Agatha stops the Eruption of the Etna volcano; Saint Agatha visits St. Peter in jail; the Glory of Saint Agatha, Trial and condemnation of Saint Agatha (1715), and Martyrdom of Saint Sebastian. A second cycle of paintings was completed with the help of his son Carlo.

Sources
Nicola Malinconico at Artcyclopedia
B. Painting and Sculpture. Oreste Ferrari The Burlington Magazine (1979) p 263.

Achille della Ragione - Nicola Malinconico pittore di natura morta - Napoli 2009

References

External links

1663 births
1721 deaths
17th-century Italian painters
Italian male painters
18th-century Italian painters
Painters from Naples
Italian Baroque painters
18th-century Italian male artists